DWDM (95.5 FM), on-air as Eagle FM 95.5, is a radio station owned and operated by the Eagle Broadcasting Corporation. The station's studio are located at EBC Bldg., No. 25 Central Ave., Diliman, Quezon City and it's transmitter facility is located at Milton Hills Subdivision, Brgy. New Era, Quezon City. The station operates daily from 4:00 AM to 12:00 MN.

History

1973–1992: DZBU/DWDM
The station was established in 1973 as DZBU. It aired a number of programs from its sister station DZEC. In November 1978, at the same time DZEC moved to 1062 AM, DZBU moved to its current frequency at 95.5 FM. In 1981, it changed its call letters to DWDM.

1992–2002: Pinoy Radio 
In 1992, it changed its name to Pinoy Radio DM 95.5 (ninety-five-five) with an all-OPM format. It was also one of the first radio stations with DJs that spoke a mix of Filipino and English. It also launches the Pinoy Music Awards where OPM artists and songs are recognized. The station lasted for 10 years until it went off the air in 2002.

2002–2007: DWDM 95.5
In 2002, it was rebranded as DWDM 95.5 (pronounced as "ninety-five-point-five") as a fully automated adult contemporary station. It was branded as "Dazzling Music", and also adapted the station's slogan "Feel Your Music". It featured music from the 90s up to the present on weekdays, with rock music on weeknights called Fascinating Refreshing Classics, as well as music from the 70s & 80s on weekends.

It ceased transmission in January 2007 to upgrade its transmitter facilities. In May 2007, it briefly returned in the airwaves on a lower bandwidth and limited broadcast hours (9 am - 1 pm). However, it went off the air again on June 8, 2007.

2011–2020: Pinas FM

On April 8, 2011, 95.5 FM returned to the airwaves as the station conducted its test broadcast for a month. At that time, it moved its studios from Maligaya Bldg. II in EDSA to New Era University Barn Building. On May 16, 2011, Pinas FM 955 (with the frequency nomenclature read as ninety-five-five) was launched. It began its broadcast at 4:00 am with Newsic, followed by some of the DJs from the Pinoy Radio roster. Upon its launching, the music content included foreign tracks similar to most masa stations in the country. On February 12, 2013, along with DZEC Radyo Agila and Net 25, the station moved to the newly built EBC Building in Quezon City.

Last April 2014, Pinas FM launched their newest theme song, entitled  "Pinas FM: Tahanan ng OPM" (Pinas FM: The Home of OPM) featuring Davey Langit, Aikee and Chadleen Lacdo-o.

Since October 5, 2014, Pinas FM made the boldest move as the station became the first and only FM station in the country that plays only Original Pilipino Music, in support of the advocacy of promoting Filipino musical talent. Prior to this, the management slowly reduced (until it eventually abandoned playing) its foreign music content in order to fully transition into an all-OPM radio station. It became the official radio station of the Organisasyon ng mga Pilipinong Mang-aawit (OPM).

On July 1 to September 29, the station was on all full-blown automated music in preparation for a relaunch.

On September 30, 2019, Pinas FM (now read as "ninety-five-point-five") was relaunched with the inclusion of its new jingle entitled "Pinoy Ka, Dito Ka", composed by DJ Rapido and sung by former 6Cyclemind vocalist Ney Dimaculangan and former Moonstar88 vocalist Acel Bisa, this was launched during "The Switch" relaunching concert.

On December 21, 2020, the jocks had their final broadcast.

2021-present: Eagle FM
On December 29, 2020, the station dropped the Pinas FM branding and its format, and switched to a classic hits format under the interim name 95.5 FM.

On January 20, 2021, the station started carrying the brand Eagle FM 95.5, with its jocks going on board on January 25. Former ABS-CBN jocks Richard Enriquez and Toni Aquino (now with DZBB) joined the station, along with some of the jocks from the Pinas FM roster.

References

External links

Radio stations established in 1973
Radio stations in Metro Manila
Iglesia ni Cristo